Lewis Colin Reilly (born 7 July 1999) is an English professional footballer who plays for Northern Premier League side [Workington AFC]. He was previously at Crewe Alexandra, Chorley and Marine.

Career

Crewe Alexandra
Reilly signed professional terms with Crewe in July 2017. He made his debut on 29 August 2017, coming on as an 89th-minute substitute for George Cooper in an EFL Trophy group stage game against Newcastle United U21s at Gresty Road. He made his first start in a Crewe shirt on 7 November 2017, again in the EFL Trophy, and scored twice in a 4–2 defeat by Port Vale at Vale Park.

Reilly made his league debut, coming on as a 76th-minute substitute at Morecambe, on 21 November 2017, and made three further substitute appearances before being named in the starting line-up for Crewe's home league game against Wycombe Wanderers on 20 January 2018.

Reilly's release by Crewe was announced on 10 June 2020.

Loans
On 9 November 2018, Reilly joined Southern Football League Premier Division Central side Halesowen Town on a month's loan, and the following day scored twice on his debut in a 3–2 FA Trophy home win over Prescot Cables. He again scored twice in Halesowen's next FA Trophy tie, against Spennymoor Town, on 24 November, and added a league goal, against Alvechurch, on 4 December 2018.

On 4 January 2019, Reilly joined National League North side Curzon Ashton on a month's loan (later extended), scoring his first goal for the club in a 4–2 win at Nuneaton Borough on 12 January. He was recalled to Crewe on 11 April 2019 having played 16 games and scored 8 goals for Curzon Ashton.

In August 2019, Reilly joined National League North side Telford United on a one-month loan deal.

In October 2019, Reilly rejoined Curzon Ashton on a month's loan, subsequently extended by a further month.

Chorley
In July 2020, it was reported Reilly had signed a pre-contract agreement to join Chorley on 1 August 2020.

Marine
In July 2021, he signed for Marine.

Career statistics

References

1999 births
Living people
English footballers
English Football League players
Crewe Alexandra F.C. players
Association football forwards
Halesowen Town F.C. players
AFC Telford United players
Curzon Ashton F.C. players
Chorley F.C. players
Footballers from Liverpool
Marine F.C. players